The terms conventional weapons or conventional arms generally refer to weapons whose ability to damage  comes from kinetic, incendiary, or explosive energy and exclude weapons of mass destruction (e.g. nuclear, biological, radiological and chemical weapons). Conventional weapons include small arms, defensive shields and light weapons, sea and land mines, as well as bombs, shells, rockets, missiles and cluster munitions. These weapons use explosive material based on chemical energy, as opposed to nuclear energy in nuclear weapons.

Conventional weapons are opposed to both "Weapons of Mass Destruction" and "Improvised Weapons".

The acceptable use of all types of conventional weapons in war time is governed by the Geneva Conventions. Certain types of conventional weapons are also regulated or prohibited under the United Nations Convention on Certain Conventional Weapons. Others are prohibited under the Convention on Cluster Munitions, the Ottawa Treaty (also known as the Mine Ban Treaty) and Arms Trade Treaty.

References

Weapons